Rudolf Olehovych Sukhomlynov (born 11 March 1993) is a Ukrainian professional footballer who plays as a left-back.

Career
Sukhomlynov is a product of the Dynamo Kyiv youth sportive school. His first coaches were Vitaliy Khmelnytskyi and Yuriy Yastrebynskyi.

He spent his career in the Ukrainian First League clubs Dynamo-2 Kyiv and Mykolaiv, Desna Chernihiv.

Personal life
He is the nephew of fellow footballer Vladyslav Sukhomlynov.

Honours

Club
Samtredia
Georgian Super Cup: 2017

References

External links
 
 
 
 

1993 births
Living people
Footballers from Kyiv
Ukrainian footballers
Ukraine youth international footballers
Association football defenders
FC Dynamo Kyiv players
FC Dynamo-2 Kyiv players
MFC Mykolaiv players
FC Desna Chernihiv players
Skonto FC players
FC Zugdidi players
FC Samtredia players
FC Arsenal Kyiv players
FC Volyn Lutsk players
FC Polissya Zhytomyr players
FC Shevardeni-1906 Tbilisi players
FC Nyva Ternopil players
FC Olimpik Donetsk players
FC Rubikon Kyiv players
Ukrainian First League players
Ukrainian Second League players
Ukrainian Amateur Football Championship players
Erovnuli Liga players
Erovnuli Liga 2 players
Ukrainian expatriate footballers
Expatriate footballers in Latvia
Ukrainian expatriate sportspeople in Latvia
Expatriate footballers in Georgia (country)
Ukrainian expatriate sportspeople in Georgia (country)